Bawdie Arboretum is an ecotourism site located in Bawdie, a town in 
the Western Region. It is located about 156 km southwest of Kumasi. The reserve has a variety of plant species and game and wildlife living in their natural habitats, including the pangolin and cinnamon.

References

National parks of Ghana
Western Region (Ghana)
Eastern Guinean forests
Protected areas established in 1990